Maigret, Lognon and the Gangsters (French: Maigret, Lognon et les gangsters) is a 1951 detective novel by the Belgian writer Georges Simenon, featuring the Paris police officer Jules Maigret. Simenon wrote it while living in Lakeville, Connecticut where he had moved after leaving France following the Liberation.

Adaptation
In 1963 it was made into a film Maigret Sees Red directed by Gilles Grangier and starring Jean Gabin as Maigret.

References

Bibliography
 Goble, Alan. The Complete Index to Literary Sources in Film. Walter de Gruyter, 1999.
 Wenger, Murielle & Trussel, Stephen. Maigret's World: A Reader's Companion to Simenon's Famous Detective. McFarland, 2017.

1951 Belgian novels
Maigret novels
Belgian novels adapted into films
Novels set in Paris
Presses de la Cité books